Grovedale College (formerly known as Grovedale Secondary College) is an Australian public high school located in Grovedale, Victoria, a suburb in the city of Geelong. It was established in 1979 as the Grovedale Technical High School. Under the guidance of the founding principal R "Bob" Arnup the new school prospered and developed a unique status at the time as a model of progressive education.

References

External links
Grovedale College Website

Schools in Geelong
Secondary schools in Victoria (Australia)